The Grasmere station is a Staten Island Railway station in the neighborhood of Grasmere, Staten Island, New York. It is located at Clove Road on the Main Line.

History
The station opened in 1886 for a cost of $555.35.

On May 21, 2012, the Grasmere station started to be rehabilitated. The construction included demolition and rebuilding of the station platform and station house. A temporary platform and entrance were built north of the main station. Construction was finished in April 2014.

Station layout

The platform is located in an open cut and has glass block and concrete windscreens attached to the canopy supports.

The Grasmere crossover, consisting of two manual switches, was located just past the Fingerboard Road overpass north of the station, but has since been removed. North of this station, the line merges with the abandoned South Beach Branch. The branch was closed on March 31, 1953 due to poor ridership and the SIRT's financial issues.

Exit
The Grasmere station's only exit is at the north end of the station, and leads to the southern side of Clove Road. This station had the original brick station house from the 1933 grade separation project, located over the Tottenville-bound track at the south end of the line, however it was demolished and replaced with a modern headhouse in the 2010's. The building is open only during the morning rush hour.

References

External links
 
Staten Island Railway station list
Staten Island Railway general information
 Clove Road entrance from Google Maps Street View
 Platform from Google Maps Street View

Staten Island Railway stations
Railway stations in the United States opened in 1886
1886 establishments in New York (state)